The black-headed antthrush (Formicarius nigricapillus) is a species of bird in the family Formicariidae.
Its natural habitats are subtropical or tropical moist lowland forests and subtropical or tropical moist montane forests.

Subspecies
 Formicarius nigricapillus nigricapillus : Caribbean slope of eastern Costa Rica and both slopes of Panama ;
 Formicarius nigricapillus destructus : Chocó of western Colombia and Ecuador.

References

black-headed antthrush
Birds of the Talamancan montane forests
Birds of the Tumbes-Chocó-Magdalena
black-headed antthrush
Taxa named by Robert Ridgway
Taxonomy articles created by Polbot